Historis acheronta, the tailed cecropian, is a species of crescents, checkerspots, anglewings, etc. in the butterfly family Nymphalidae.

The MONA or Hodges number for Historis acheronta is 4546.

References

Further reading

External links

 

Coeini
Butterflies of Central America
Nymphalidae of South America
Butterflies of the Caribbean
Lepidoptera of Brazil
Lepidoptera of Colombia
Fauna of Cuba
Lepidoptera of Ecuador
Lepidoptera of French Guiana
Butterflies of North America
Lepidoptera of Peru
Lepidoptera of Venezuela
Fauna of the Amazon
Butterflies described in 1775
Articles created by Qbugbot
Taxa named by Johan Christian Fabricius